In Greek mythology, Elaea is an Attic girl who won the favour of Athena thanks to her impressive athletic achievements and her beauty, and the envy of the other Atticans for the same reason. Her story shares many elements with that of Myrsine. Her brief tale survives in the works of Nicolaus Sophista, a Greek sophist and rhetor who lived during the fifth century AD.

Mythology 
Elaea was an extremely athletic girl who outdid all girls in beauty and all boys in strength, winning herself the favour and love of Athena, the virgin goddess of wisdom and patron-goddess of Attica. Elaea beat all her opponents in both the ring and the race, who grew resentful of her. Many of her fellow athletes whom she had beaten  then decided to murder her out of envy. But Athena took pity in her favourite, and for Athena's sake Gaia, the goddess of the earth, metamorphosed the dead girl into a olive tree, which was the most sacred tree associated with Athens and Athena. A similar, almost word-for-word, story was also told about another maiden, Myrsine, who was changed into a myrtle shrub.

See also 

 Arachne
 Myrina
 Myrmex

References

Bibliography 
 
 

Attican characters in Greek mythology
Metamorphoses into trees in Greek mythology
Deeds of Athena
Women in Greek mythology
Deeds of Gaia